Lewis Evans (born 9 July 1987, Newport, Wales) is a former Welsh rugby union player. A back row forward, he previously played his club rugby for the Dragons for the duration of his fifteen-year career. 
After being invited into the Newport Gwent Dragons academy in 2005, he then went on to play his rugby for [Ebbw Vale RFC] and Newport RFC. He has represented Wales at every age group level winning the Grand Slam with the U19's in 2006 and featured in the Wales national rugby sevens team in 2007.

Evans was called up to the senior Wales team for the tour of North America in 2009, though he was later cut from the squad and put on stand by. In November 2011 Evans was named in the senior Wales squad for the match versus Australia on 3 December 2011.

In the 2012–13 season, Newport Gwent Dragons named Evans as their captain, replacing the departing [Luke Charteris] and then later again for the 2015–16 season. He eventually captained the region on more than 50 occasions.

After many years coaching age grade rugby for the Dragons region and Newport RFC in the 2016–17 season, he is now retired as a player and the recently appointed Director of Rugby for Kroll USRC Tigers in Hong Kong for the 2021–22 season.

References

External links
Dragons profile

Welsh rugby union players
Ebbw Vale RFC players
Newport RFC players
Dragons RFC players
Living people
1987 births
Rugby union players from Newport, Wales
Rugby union flankers
Rugby union number eights
Welsh rugby sevens players
Welsh expatriate sportspeople in Hong Kong
Welsh rugby union coaches